Valdemar or Waldemar is an Old High German given name.

Valdemar or Waldemar may also refer to:

 Valdemar (fictional country), the setting for a number of fantasy stories by Mercedes Lackey
 the protagonist in Edgar Allan Poe's short story "The Facts in the Case of M. Valdemar"

See also